Soli is a Bantu language of Zambia. It is part of the Botatwe group, who live mainly in Lusaka province and Central Province together with the Tonga and Lenje people

See also
Soli people

References

Languages of Zambia
Botatwe languages